Schneider Electric SE is a French multinational company that specializes in digital automation and energy management. It addresses homes, buildings, data centers, infrastructure and industries, by combining energy technologies, real-time automation, software, and services.

Schneider Electric is a Fortune Global 500 company, publicly traded on the Euronext Exchange, and is a component of the Euro Stoxx 50 stock market index. In fiscal year 2022, the company posted revenues of €34.2 billion.

Schneider Electric is the parent company of Square D, APC, and others. It is also a research company.

History

1836–1963

In 1836, brothers Adolphe and Joseph-Eugene Schneider took over an iron foundry in Le Creusot, France. Two years later, they founded Schneider-Creusot, the company that would eventually become Schneider Electric. Initially, Schneider-Creusot specialized in the production of steel, heavy machinery, and transportation equipment. In 1871, following France's defeat in the Franco-Prussian War, the company significantly developed its capacity for weapons manufacturing. Over the first half of the 20th century, Schneider-Creusot continued to grow, establishing manufacturing sites in France and abroad, including in pre-Soviet Russia and Czechoslovakia.

1963–1999

In the 1960s, following the death of Charles Schneider, Schneider-Creusot was absorbed by Belgium's Empain group, which merged Schneider-Creusot with its own corporate structures to form Empain-Schneider. In 1981, the Empain family sold its controlling stake to Paribas. In the 1980s and 1990s, the company, once again operating under the Schneider name, divested from steel and shipbuilding and, through strategic acquisitions, began to focus on the electricity sector.

1999–present

In January of 1999, Schneider acquired the Scandinavian switch-maker Lexel. Later that year, the company renamed itself Schneider Electric, to reflect its focus on the electricity sector.

In October 2006, Schneider Electric announced that it would acquire the data center equipment manufacturer American Power Conversion for $6.1 billion. The following February, the move was finalized following its approval by the European Commission. In June of 2010, Schneider and the rolling stock manufacturer Alstom jointly purchased Areva's transmission and distribution businesses in a transaction totaling $2.73 billion.

In 2016, Schneider acquired Tower Electric, a British company that manufactured fixings and fastenings for construction and electrical firms. In 2017, Schneider Electric became the majority shareholder of Aveva, a provider of engineering and industrial software based in the UK.

In February 2020, Schneider made a €1.4 billion takeover bid for German company RIB Software, closing the deal in July 2020. Also in 2020, Schneider Electric acquired ProLeiT AG, a supplier of industrial control and MES software.

In April 2021, Schneider introduced 'The Zero Carbon Project'. Since then, it has shown its commitment to minimize 'operational carbon emissions' by 2025.

In January 2023, Schneider Electric's acquisition of Aveva was finalized.

Notable acquisitions

Organizational structure and offer
Since 2019, Schneider Electric has been operating business units: Energy Management, Industrial Automation, and Services.

Energy Management

The Energy Management business provides products for the management of energy in medium voltage and grid automation, low voltage and building automation, secure power and cooling applications.

Services

The Services business includes three divisions: Global Field Services, Energy and Sustainability Services, and Smart grid Services.

EcoStruxure
In 2016 Schneider Electric launched the next generation of EcoStruxure – an IoT-enabled architecture. The EcoStruxure platform uses Microsoft Azure. In 2021, the EcoStruxure solutions introduced by Schneider helped customers lessen 'carbon emissions' by 84 million tonnes.

In April 2019, the company launched Schneider Electric Exchange, an open business platform. In June 2022, Schneider Electric introduced its EcoStruxure Machine Expert Twin, an adaptable digital shadow software solution that aims to handle the machine's 'lifecycle'.

Operations

Research and development investment 
In its Innovation Summit North America, Schneider Electric expressed its aim to assess emerging technologies, support and subsidize startups through guiding them. In FY2021, Schneider Electric announced that its research and development expenses were around 855 million euros.

Operational technology 
In January 2023, Schneider Electric's interest to develop the area of Operational Technology was concretized through its partnership with BitSight, a specialist in the field of cybersecurity. In fact, their collaboration seeks to realize a unique 'global Operational Technology (OT) Risk Identification and Threat Intelligence capability' that aims to detect the threats to Operational Technology  and consolidate 'industrial security'.

Head office
Schneider Electric has had its head office in Rueil-Malmaison, France since 2000. The company uses an international operations model wherein its key personnel and large numbers of its staff are spread across main offices in Reuil-Malmaison, Hong Kong, Noida, and Boston.

See also

 Creusot steam hammer

References

External links

Schneider Electric global blog

 
CAC 40
Companies based in Île-de-France
Companies in the Euro Stoxx 50
Companies listed on Euronext Paris
Conglomerate companies of France
Electric transformer manufacturers
Electrical engineering companies of France
Electrical wiring and construction supplies manufacturers
Electronics companies of France
French brands
Locomotive manufacturers of France
Manufacturers of industrial automation
MES software
Multinational companies headquartered in France
French companies established in 1836
Manufacturing companies established in 1836